Proctor Creek is a stream in the U.S. state of Georgia. It is a tributary to the Etowah River.

Proctor Creek was named after John Proctor, the proprietor of a local mill. A variant name is "Proctors Creek".

References

Rivers of Georgia (U.S. state)
Rivers of Dawson County, Georgia